Gosaibaganer Bhoot is a Bengali comedy-fantasy film directed by art director, production designer, and costume designer Nitish Roy, based on a novel by Bengali writer Shirshendu Mukhopadhyay. The music/lyrics was composed by Bengali brand Chandrabindoo.

Plot
The film narrates the tale of Burun, who is hopelessly weak in mathematics and has to take lessons from an eccentric teacher (Karali Sir). However, not all is well in Burun's world and he strays into Gosainbagan, befriends an enduring ghost (Nidhiram Sardar) only to later battle an evil force by the name of Habu.

Cast
 Dedipya Ganguly as Burun
 Antony as Gosaibaba
 Victor Banerjee as Ram Kobiraj
 Sajal Haldar as Fatik
 YourPritam as Raja 
 Kanchan Mullick as Nidhiram (Ghost)
 Biswajit Chakraborty as Sachin Sarkar (Head Master)
 Tinu Anand as Manmatha Ukil
 Paran Bandyopadhyay as Korali Master
 Shankar Chakraborty as Godai Daroga
 Ashish Vidyarthi as Habu Sardar
 Saswata Chatterjee as Bhelu Daktar
 Dwijen Bandopadhyay as Panchkori Adhya
 Kharaj Mukherjee as Damodar Kaka
 Biplab Chatterjee as Kailash Mitra
 Locket Chatterjee as Burun's Mother

Music

Soundtrack

See also
Chhayamoy

References

External links
 
Bengali-language Indian films
2010s Bengali-language films
2011 films
Films based on works by Shirshendu Mukhopadhyay